Agal Vilakkugal was a 2002 Indian Tamil soap opera that aired on Sun TV. The show premiered on 18 February 2002 and ran until 26 December 2003, with 495 episodes airing Monday through Friday at 11:00AM IST. The show starred Rajashree, Vadivukkarasi, Anju, Pallavi, Harita, Vinodhini, Nithya Ravindran, Robert–Rajasekar, Dharani, Golden Suresh, Sethuvinayagam, and Prem Sai. It was directed by R.V. Ramesh Raj and Vimala Ramanan produced it. The story revolves around a place called Navalur and is about the life of a college student, Seetha.

Cast

 Rajashree as Seetha
 Vadivukkarasi
 Anju
 Pallavi
 Harita
 Vinodhini
 Nithya Ravindran
Ponvannan
 Robert Rajasekar
 Dharani
 Golden Suresh
 Sethuvinayagam
 Prem Sai
 O. A. K. Sundar
 Gowthami Vembunathan

See also
 List of programs broadcast by Sun TV
 List of TV shows aired on Sun TV (India)

References

External links
 

Sun TV original programming
2002 Tamil-language television series debuts
Television shows set in Tamil Nadu
Tamil-language melodrama television series
Tamil-language television shows
2003 Tamil-language television series endings